Willis H. Stephens (born June 7, 1925) is an American retired politician who was a member of the New York State Assembly from Brewster, New York.

Life
Stephens was a member of the State Assembly from 1953 to 1982, sitting in the 169th, 170th, 171st, 172nd, 173rd, 174th, 175th, 176th, 177th, 178th, 179th, 180th, 181st, 182nd, 183rd and 184th New York State Legislature. As Chairman of the Committee on Ways and Means, from 1969 to 1974, Stephens was considered one of the most powerful and influential men in New York.

His father, D. Mallory Stephens, served the same constituency from 1926 to 1952 and his son, Willis H. Stephens Jr., served in the seat from 1995 to 2006.

His grandfather, Henry B. Stephens, was a two-term Sheriff of Putnam County, New York, and his great-grandfather, Daniel B. Mallory, was a member of the Connecticut State Senate.

External links
Political Graveyard - Stephens Family of New York

1925 births
Living people
Politicians from Putnam County, New York
Republican Party members of the New York State Assembly
People from Brewster, New York